The Case–Church Amendment was legislation attached to a bill funding the U.S. State Department. it was approved by the U.S. Congress in June 1973 that prohibited further U.S. military activity in Vietnam, Laos and Cambodia unless the president secured Congressional approval in advance. This ended direct U.S. military involvement in the Vietnam War, although the U.S. continued to provide military equipment and economic support to the South Vietnamese government. It is named for its principal co-sponsors, Senators Clifford P. Case (R-NJ) and Frank Church (D-ID). The Amendment was defeated 48–42 in the U.S. Senate in August 1972, but revived after the 1972 election. It was reintroduced on January 26, 1973 and approved by the Senate Foreign Relations Committee on May 13. When it became apparent that the Amendment would pass, President Richard Nixon and Secretary of State Henry Kissinger, lobbied frantically to have the deadline extended. However, under pressure from the extreme scrutiny of Watergate, Republicans relented on support for South Vietnam and the amendment passed the United States Congress in June 1973 by a margin of 325–86 in the House, 73–16 in the Senate. Both of these margins for the amendment's passage were greater than the two-thirds majority required to override a presidential veto, and Nixon signed it on July 1, 1973. Although U.S. forces had been withdrawn from South Vietnam in March 1973 pursuant to the Paris Peace Accords, air support and monetary support for Cambodia and Laos continued until August 15, 1973, the deadline set by the Amendment.

See also

 Fall of Saigon
 Opposition to the Vietnam War

References

Congressional opposition to the Vietnam War
Political history of the United States
Vietnam War